Aleksandr Leonidovich Gorbatcevich (born 16 August 1994) is a Russian luger who competes internationally.
 
He represented his country's Olympic committee at the 2022 Winter Olympics.

References

External links
 
 
 

1994 births
Living people
People from Bratsk
Russian male lugers
Olympic lugers of Russia
Lugers at the 2022 Winter Olympics
Sportspeople from Irkutsk Oblast